The Moldovan National Time Trial Championships have been held since 1997.

The winners of each event are awarded with a symbolic cycling jersey featuring red, yellow and blue, the colors of the national flag, which can be worn by the rider at other time trialling events in the country to show their status as national champion. The champion's stripes can be combined into a sponsored rider's team kit design for this purpose.

Multiple winners 
Riders that managed to win the race more than once.

Men

See also
Moldovan National Road Race Championships
National road cycling championships

References

National road cycling championships
Cycle races in Moldova
Recurring sporting events established in 1997
1997 establishments in Moldova